Lepidoblepharis peraccae is a species of gecko, a lizard in the family Sphaerodactylidae. The species is endemic to western Colombia.

Etymology
The specific name, peraccae, is in honor of Italian herpetologist Mario Giacinto Peracca.

Geographic range
L. peraccae is found in Chocó Department and Valle del Cauca Department, Colombia.

Description

Reproduction
L. peraccae is oviparous.

References

Further reading
Boulenger GA (1908). "Descriptions of new South-American Reptiles". Annals and Magazine of Natural History, Eighth Series 1: 111–115. (Lepidoblepharis peraccae, new species, pp. 111–112).
Valencia-Zuleta A, Jaramillo-Martínez AF, Echeverry-Bocanegra A, Viáfra-Vega R, Hernández-Córdoba O, Cardona-Botero VE, Gutiérrez-Zúñiga J, Castro-Herrera F (2014). "Conservation status of the herpetofauna, protected areas, and current problems in Valle del Cauca, Colombia". Amphibian & Reptile Conservation 8: 1–18.

Lepidoblepharis
Reptiles described in 1908